The Farafra depression is a  geological depression, the second biggest by size in Western Egypt and the smallest by population, near latitude 27.06° north and longitude 27.97° east. It is in the large Western Desert of Egypt, approximately midway between Dakhla and Bahariya oases.

Farafra has an estimated 5,000 inhabitants (2002) mainly living in the town of Farafra and is mostly inhabited by the local Bedouins. Parts of the town have complete quarters of traditional architecture, simple, smooth, unadorned, all in mud colour — local culture and traditional methods of building and carrying out repairs have been supported by its tourism.  Often grouped within Farafra are the hot springs at Bir Sitta (the sixth well) and the El-Mufid lake.

Etymology 
The word al-Farafra (al-Farafira in local pronunciation,  al-Farfarun in Middle Ages) is a broken plural form of  farfar meaning "fizzy spring".

History 

Archaeological evidence suggests that Farafra region was inhabited since late Pleistocene. Farafra was known in ancient Egyptian history at least since the Middle Kingdom. In the Ptolemaic period, the region was under the administration of the Oxyrhynchite nome (19th Upper Egyptian nome).

White Desert

It has massive chalk rock formations that are textbook examples of ventifact and which have been created as a result of occasional sandstorm in the area. The White Desert is a typical place visited by some schools in Egypt, as a location for camping trips.

Wells

Due to its geographical location and geological formation it has more than 100 wells spread out over the lands of the Farafra, many of which are natural. Most of these wells are used in aggregation of the cultivated land in the oasis. Some of the wells in Farafra have become a favorite tourist destination. Bir Sitta, (well 6 in Arabic), Bir Sab'a (well 7) and Bir Ithnian wa ishrin (well 22) are the most important. Because of the water's warm temperature and a slight percentage of sulfur, these wells are favorable for swimming and relaxation. There is a large lake touristic well named Abu Nus 15 kilometers north of the edge of the Farafra.

Climate
Köppen-Geiger climate classification system classifies its climate as hot desert (BWh).

Gallery

References

Bibliography
 Frank Bliss: 'Oasenleben. Die ägyptischen Oasen Bahriya und Farafra in Vergangenheit und Gegenwart'. Die ägyptischen Oasen Band 2. Bonn 2006.
 Frank Bliss: 'Artisanat et artisanat d’art dans les oasis du désert occidental égyptien'. "Veröffentlichungen des Frobenius-Instituts". Köln 1998.
 Beadnell, Hugh J. L. The Farafra Oasis: Its Topography and Geology. Geological Survey Report. Part 3  Egypt. Maṣlaḥat al-Misāḥah. 1901.
 Fakhry, Ahmed. 1974. Bahriyah and Farafra. Reissue of the Classic History and Description. Illustrated, reprint. Publisher: American Univ. in Cairo Press, 1974. , 9789774247323. 189 pages.

External links

 Farafra oasis on Wikivoyage

Populated places in New Valley Governorate
Oases of Egypt
Western Desert (Egypt)